Iva Budařová (born 30 July 1960) is a former professional tennis player from Czechoslovakia.

Budařová played on the WTA Tour from 1978 until 1991, winning four doubles titles.  She achieved a career high singles ranking of world No. 24 (in 1983) and a doubles ranking of No. 55 (in 1987). Budařová was a member of the Czechoslovakia Fed Cup team that won the Federation Cup 1983 and 1984.

WTA Tour finals

Singles

Doubles (4–2)

ITF finals

Singles (3–5)

Doubles (1–1)

References

External links
 
 
 

1960 births
Living people
Czechoslovak female tennis players
Czech female tennis players
Universiade medalists in tennis
Universiade silver medalists for Czechoslovakia
People from Duchcov
Medalists at the 1987 Summer Universiade
Competitors at the 1986 Goodwill Games
Goodwill Games medalists in tennis
Sportspeople from the Ústí nad Labem Region